Connor Dawson is an American professional baseball hitting coach for the Milwaukee Brewers of Major League Baseball (MLB).

Dawson graduated from Olathe North High School in Olathe, Kansas, in 2012. He played college baseball at Neosho County Community College, and transitioned into coaching. He coached a college prep baseball team and served as a hitting coach at St. Thomas Aquinas High School from 2015 to 2018. In 2019, he coached for Marshalltown Community College.

Dawson joined the Seattle Mariners organization as a minor league hitting coach in 2019. Following the 2021 season, the Milwaukee Brewers fired their major league hitting coach, Andy Haines, and hired Dawson and Ozzie Timmons to replace him.

References

Living people
Year of birth missing (living people)
1990s births
Sportspeople from Olathe, Kansas
Neosho County Panthers baseball players
Milwaukee Brewers coaches
Major League Baseball hitting coaches